is a Japanese singer and actress, represented by Production Ogi. She was a member of the Japanese idol girl group AKB48, and its subunit no3b. She is noted for having the longest tenure among the group's original members from 2005 to 2021.

Career

Early days at AKB48
Minegishi debuted with AKB48 Team A in 2005. She ranked 14th in the AKB48 2012 general election with 25,638 votes. She is one of the three members of AKB48 sub-group no3b, with whom she played in the drama Mendol, Ikemen Idol in 2008 and sang its theme song as the fictional band "Persona". She has also been a frequent guest on television variety shows. Beyond appearing in commercials as a member of AKB48, she has also appeared in some by herself.

Scandal and demotion
On January 31, 2013, the weekly tabloid Shukan Bunshun reported that she had spent a night at the apartment of Alan Shirahama with a member of the boy band Generations from Exile Tribe. A few hours later, it was announced through the AKB48 official blog that she would be demoted from one of the official members of Umeda Team B to kenkyūsei (trainee) status as of February 1. She thus became the first AKB48 member to be demoted to kenkyūsei in four years since Miki Saotome in late January 2009. On the same day, the AKB48 official channel published a video of Minegishi with her head shaved (or more accurately reduced to a crew cut), apologizing to her fans for her "thoughtless behavior" and hoping that the management would let her stay in the group, with other members that she loved. In the YouTube statement, Minegishi explained that she cut her hair in a state of shock induced by reading the Shukan Bunshun scoop, when she could not calm down. However, in Japan, cutting one's hair is a way of showing contrition.

In an article for The Japan Times, titled: "AKB48 member’s ‘penance’ shows flaws in idol culture", Ian Martin noted: "What is happening here is that the protection of fans’ fragile fantasies automatically trumps the basic human right to a life outside that fantasy framework. Though as lawyer Hifumi Okunuki pointed out in a Japan Times article on Jan. 22, such an arrangement is probably illegal under Japanese labor laws."

Numerous international media reported this incident, including Agence France-Presse, BBC, CNN, Daily News, The Guardian, ABC, The Huffington Post, Radio Programas del Perú, Aftonbladet, Spiegel Online, Al Jazeera English and the Manila Bulletin.

Return 

Graduation 
On December 8, 2019, Minegishi announced her graduation. Her graduation concert was initially scheduled to occur on April 2, 2020 at Yokohama Arena, but was postponed due to the COVID-19 pandemic. Her graduation song, was included in AKB48's 57th single "Shitsuren, Arigatō", released on March 18, 2020.

Her postponed concert was eventually rescheduled to May 22, 2021, and was held at Pia Arena MM in Yokohama. She officially graduated from AKB48 on May 28, ending her 16-year membership with the group.

Personal life
On August 16, 2022, Minegishi announced her marriage to Tokai On Air leader Tetsuya.

Discography

Singles with AKB48

Albums with AKB48
 Kamikyokutachi
 "Baby! Baby! Baby! Baby!"
 "Kimi to Niji to Taiyō to"

 Koko ni Ita Koto
 "Shōjotachi yo"
 "Boku ni Dekiru Koto" (Team K)
 "Kaze no Yukue"
 "Koko ni Ita Koto"

 1830m
 "First Rabbit"
 "Iede no Yoru" (Team K)
 "Itterasshai"
 "Aozora yo Sabishikunai Ka?" (AKB48 + SKE48 + NMB48 + HKT48)

 Tsugi no Ashiato
 "After Rain"
 "Team Zaka" (Team 4)
 "Ichi ni no San"

 Koko ga Rhodes da, Koko de Tobe!
 "Ai no Sonzai"
 "Panama Unga"
 "Namida wa Atomawashi"

 0 to 1 no Aida
 "Ai no Shisha" (Team K)

With no3b

Filmography

Films
 Ashita no Watashi no Tsukurikata (2007)
 Densen Uta (2007)
 Moshidora (2011)
 Documentary of AKB48: Show Must Go On (2012)
 Documentary of AKB48: No Flower Without Rain (2013)
 Joshikō (2016)
 Owari ga Hajimari (2021)

Television
 Joshideka!: Joshi Keiji (TBS, 2007)
 Guren Onna (episode 5: guest appearance only) (TV Tokyo, 2008)
 Cat Street (NHK, 2008), Yukari
 Mendol: Ikemen Idol (TV Tokyo, 2008), Hinata Otowa/Kū
 Koi Shite Akuma: Vampire Boy (KTV, 2009), Saki Inaba
 Majisuka Gakuen (TV Tokyo, 2010), herself
 Sakura Kara no Tegami: AKB48 Sorezore no Sotsugyō Monogatari (Nippon TV, 2011), herself
 Majisuka Gakuen 2 (TV Tokyo, 2011), Shaku(ex-student president)
 Soup Curry (HBC and TBS, 2012), Megumi Natsukawa
 So Long! (NTV, 2013), Mitsuki Watase
 Aoyama 1-seg Kaihatsu (NHK, 2014–2015), Nana Kawahara
AKB Horror Night: Adrenaline's Night Ep.35 - Claim (2016), Kyōko
AKB Love Night: Love Factory Ep.9 - Way Back Home (2016), Aika
Last One Standing (Netflix, 2022), herself
AKB48 Sayonara Mōri-san (Nippon TV, 2022–present), regular

Bibliography

Photobooks
 B.L.T. U-17 Vol.7 summer (7 August 2008, Tokyo News Service) 
 South (23 August 2008, Wani Books) 
 私は私 : 峯岸みなみフォト&エッセイ (19 July 2016, Takeshobo)

References

External links

   
 Official AKB48 profile 
 Official agency profile at Ogipro 
 

1992 births
Living people
Japanese female idols
AKB48 members
Singers from Tokyo
21st-century Japanese women singers
21st-century Japanese singers
21st-century Japanese actresses
Entertainment scandals